Isaac Bradley Jordan Buckley-Ricketts (born 14 March 1998) is an English footballer who plays as a forward for Warrington Town .

Career

Manchester City

Born in Manchester, England, Buckley-Ricketts joined Manchester City at 13. After progressing through the ranks of Manchester City's Academy, he signed a scholarship with the club in July 2014. Buckley-Ricketts quickly progressed through the club's U18 side and then the development squad.

FC Twente (Loan) 
Buckley-Ricketts played abroad for the first time in his career when he joined Eredivisie side FC Twente on a season-long loan for the 2017–18 season. He made his Twente debut in the opening game of the season, on 13 August 2017, coming on as a second-half substitute for Nikola Gjorgjev, in a 2–1 loss against Feyenoord. However, his first-team opportunities were limited, so he returned to England in January 2018 having made eight appearances for Twente.

Oxford United (Loan)

On 12 January 2018, Buckley-Ricketts joined League One club Oxford United on loan for the rest of the 2017–18 season. He made his debut on 20 January in a 2–1 home defeat to bottom club Bury.

Peterborough United

Buckley-Ricketts signed for Peterborough United in the summer of 2018 but was subsequently transfer-listed by the club at the end of the 2018–19 season having made only two appearances throughout the campaign. On 2 September 2019, Buckley-Ricketts was released by Peterborough United.

Stretford Paddock

On Buckley-Ricketts' release from Peterborough United he was signed for Stretford Paddock, an Amateur Football Club by manager and owner, Stephen Howson, in Manchester.

Southport

On 3 August 2021, following a successful trial period, Buckley-Ricketts signed for  Southport in the National League North on a two year contract.  On 28 February 2022, he signed for Northern Premier League Premier Division side Warrington Town on loan deal until 3 April.

International career

After being called up by England U18, Buckley-Ricketts made his England U18 debut on 23 March 2016, playing 74 minutes before being substituted, in a 3–2 win over Austria U18. He went on to make four appearances for the side.

He made his England U19 debut on 1 September 2016, coming on as a late substitute in a 1–1 draw against Netherlands U19. He then scored his first England U19 goal, as well as setting up one of the goals, in a 5–1 win over Belarus U19 on 27 March 2017. Buckley-Ricketts was in the team that won the 2017 UEFA European Under-19 Championship in Georgia, managed by Keith Downing. He went on to make 12 appearances and scored once for the England U19 side.

Buckley-Ricketts made his England U20 debut on 31 August 2017, in a 3–0 win over the Netherlands U20. He then scored his first goals for England U20 in a 5–1 win over Italy U20.

Career statistics

References

External links

England profile at The Football Association
 

1998 births
Living people
English footballers
Association football forwards
Manchester City F.C. players
FC Twente players
Oxford United F.C. players
Peterborough United F.C. players
Southport F.C. players
Warrington Town F.C. players
Eredivisie players
English Football League players
National League (English football) players
Northern Premier League players